Manda I is a mountain of the Garhwal Himalaya in Uttarakhand India also called Manda. It is joint 86th highest located entirely within the Uttarakhand. Nanda Devi, is the highest mountain in this category. It lies  NE of Jogin II .

Gangotri National Park
The entire surrounding area are protected within the  Gangotri National Park, one of the largest conservation area in India. The Gangotri National Park is home to several world-class treks, including Gangotri Gomukh Tapoban Nandanvan, Kerdarnath Vasuki tal trek, Har ki dun valley trek,  Badrinath to Satopanth tal trek, Gangotri to Kedartal trek, Gangotri to Badrinath trek via Kalindi khal and many more.

Climbing history
A four member team led by Minoo Mehta, Danesh Kalyaniwala, Muslim Contractor and Rustom Anita attempted Manda from Kedar ganga valley, Kedar glacier. Rustom Anita and their HAP Nandan Singh reached the top on 4 June 1981. This was the first ascent of Manda.
The second ascent of Manda by Ehime University of Japan in 1981. A five member team of Ehime University of Japan comprising Masatosi Sasaki, Tomoyuki Sogabe, Takanori Sasaki, Hiroyuki Kawaguchi and Tsunenori Okada. On June 18 Sogabe, T. Sasaki and Kawaguchi reached the summit following the same route of Minoo Mehta.

Neighboring and subsidiary peaks
neighboring or subsidiary peaks of Manda I:
 Thalay Sagar: 
 Meru Peak: 
 Manda III: 
 Shivling: 
 Gangotri I: 
 Gangotri II: 
 Gangotri III: 
 Jogin II:

Glaciers and rivers
On the western side lies Kedar Bamak and on the eastern side lies Bhrigupanth Bamak. Kedar Ganga emerges from Kedar bamak and joins Bhagirathi River near Gangotri. Bhrigupanth Bamak drain down to Bhagirathi River near Bhojwas. Bhagirathi joins the Alaknanda River the other main tributaries of river Ganga at Dev Prayag and called Ganga there after.

See also

 List of Himalayan peaks of Uttarakhand

References

Mountains of Uttarakhand
Six-thousanders of the Himalayas
Geography of Chamoli district